Liu Ye may refer to:

Liu Ye (Three Kingdoms) (died 234), Cao Wei politician during the Three Kingdoms period
Liu Ye (Tang dynasty) (died 881), Tang Dynasty official
Liu Ye (artist) (born 1964), Chinese artist
Liu Ye (actor) (born 1978), Chinese actor